Alex McDonald may refer to:

Alex McDonald (prospector) (1859–1909), prospector who made and lost a fortune in the Klondike Gold Rush
Alex McDonald (Wisconsin politician) (1866-1936), American politician
Alex McDonald (footballer, born 1878) (1878–1949), Scottish footballer for various English clubs
Alex McDonald (rugby union) (1883–1967), New Zealand rugby union player, coach and administrator
Alex McDonald (athlete) (born 1945), Jamaican middle-distance runner and sprinter
Alex McDonald (Australian rules footballer) (born 1970), Australian rules footballer for Collingwood and Hawthorn
Alex McDonald Shipyard on Staten Island

See also
Alex MacDonald (footballer born 1948), Scottish footballer who played for St. Johnstone, Rangers and Hearts
Alex MacDonald (footballer born 1990), Scottish footballer currently playing for Falkirk, on loan from Burnley
Alexander McDonald (disambiguation)
Alexander MacDonald (disambiguation)